The 16th Arizona State Legislature, consisting of the Arizona State Senate and the Arizona House of Representatives, was constituted in Phoenix from January 1, 1943, to December 31, 1944, during the second of  Sidney Preston Osborn's four consecutive terms as Governor of Arizona. The number of senators remained constant at 19, while the house increased from 52 to 58 members. The Democrats controlled all the senate and house seats.

Sessions
The Legislature met for the regular session at the State Capitol in Phoenix on January 11, 1943; and adjourned on March 14. There were two special sessions, the first of which was held from February 15 through February 24, 1944, and the second of which was held from February 25 – March 16, 1944.

State Senate

Members

The asterisk (*) denotes members of the previous Legislature who continued in office as members of this Legislature.

House of Representatives

Members
The asterisk (*) denotes members of the previous Legislature who continued in office as members of this Legislature. The size of the House increased to 58 members; 4 seats were added in Maricopa County and 2 in Pima County.

References

Arizona legislative sessions
1943 in Arizona
1944 in Arizona
1943 U.S. legislative sessions
1944 U.S. legislative sessions